Congriscus is a genus of eels in the family Congridae.

Species
There are currently three recognized species in this genus:
 Congriscus maldivensis (Norman, 1939)
 Congriscus marquesaensis Karmovskaya, 2004
 Congriscus megastomus (Günther, 1877)

References

Congridae
Taxa named by David Starr Jordan